Esqyr (pronounced "Esquire") is a test prep company based in Minneapolis, which provides a la carte tools to study for a license or credential, using materials from previously tested exams. It launched in August 2016 with three bar review products for the bar exam.

Esqyr is the first public benefit corporation focused on test prep, and donates 20% of its profits to tackle student debt. It has been featured in Minnesota Business Magazine (for which it won the Most Likely to Succeed award for 2017, and was spotlighted in its "entrepreneurs" issue), and has been covered by the NASFAA for its social mission.

References

Bar examinations
Test preparation companies
Public benefit corporations based in the United States